The 1924–25 season was Stoke's 25th season in the Football League and the sixth in the Second Division.

Following the squad clear-out by manager Tom Mather and with a number of new useful signings Stoke had a decent looking squad on paper going into the 1924–25 season. However the performances out on the pitch were poor and the team was almost relegated staying up by a single point.

Season review

League
A strong new chairman emerged with the arrival in August 1924 of Mr A. McSherwin who had already spent eleven years on the board and he would go on to hold his position for the next twelve years. After a period of real doubt, confidence started to emerge for the 1924–25 season and was certainly helped by Tom Mather replacing old players with new fresh talent. Under new skipper Vic Rouse, Stoke started the season reasonably well and seemed to have the basis of a useful side with the likes of goalkeeper Bob Dixon, Bob McGrory, Alec Milne, Bert Ralphs, Harry Davies and Len Armitage in the squad.

But overall performances on the pitch were below standard and the team went 12 matches without a win (1 January 1925 to 21 March 1925) and were almost relegated. Four wins and three draws in their last eight matches ensured survival by the narrowest of margins, a single point.

FA Cup
Stoke exited the cup at the first round going down to a poor 3–0 defeat at Leicester City.

Final league table

Results
Stoke's score comes first

Legend

Football League Second Division

FA Cup

Squad statistics

References

Stoke City F.C. seasons
Stoke